Coelorachis is a genus of plants in the grass family, widespread across much of Asia, Africa, Australia and the Americas.

Coelorhachis is treated by some sources as part of the genus Mnesithea, so the following species can generally be found under that name in those listings.

 Species
 Coelorachis afraurita (Stapf) Stapf - tropical Africa
 Coelorachis aurita (Steud.) A.Camus - tropical America from Chiapas + Trinidad to Paraguay
 Coelorachis balansae (Hack.) A.Camus - Brazil, Argentina, Uruguay, Paraguay
 Coelorachis cancellata (Ridl.) Bor - Bangka, Pen Malaysia, Thailand, Vietnam
 Coelorachis capensis Stapf - Cape Province, KwaZulu-Natal
 Coelorachis clarkei (Hack.) Blatt. & McCann - India, Myanmar
 Coelorachis cylindrica (Michx.) Nash - southeastern + south-central USA
 Coelorachis geminata (Hack.) Clayton - Pen Malaysia, Thailand, Kalimantan
 Coelorachis glandulosa (Trin.) Stapf ex Ridl. - Southeast Asia, New Guinea, Andaman & Nicobar Islands
 Coelorachis helferi (Hook.f.) Henrard 	 - Pen Malaysia, Indochina
 Coelorachis impressa (Griseb.) Nash  - Cuba
 Coelorachis khasiana (Hack.) Stapf ex Bor - Yunnan, Sikkim, Bhutan, Arunachal Pradesh, Myanmar
 Coelorachis lepidura Stapf - Kenya, Tanzania, Mozambique
 Coelorachis parodiana Henrard - Paraguay, Argentina
 Coelorachis ramosa (E.Fourn.) Nash  - tropical America from Veracruz to southern Brazil
 Coelorachis rottboellioides (R.Br.) A.Camus - Australia, New Guinea, Philippines, Lesser Sunda Islands
 Coelorachis rugosa (Nutt.) Nash - Cuba; USA from Texas to New Jersey
 Coelorachis selloana (Hack.) A.Camus - Brazil, Argentina, Uruguay, Paraguay
 Coelorachis striata (Steud.) A.Camus - Yunnan, Indochina, eastern Himalayas
 Coelorachis tessellata (Steud.) Nash - USA (Alabama, Florida, Louisiana, Georgia, Mississippi) 
 Coelorachis tuberculosa (Nash) Nash - Cuba; USA (Alabama, Florida, Georgia)

 formerly included
see Eremochloa Hemarthria Lasiurus Mnesithea Phacelurus Rhytachne Rottboellia

References

Panicoideae
Grasses of Africa
Grasses of Asia
Grasses of Europe
Grasses of North America
Grasses of Oceania
Grasses of South America
Poaceae genera